Edward Albert Nicholls (born 10 December 1947 in British Guiana) is a former international Test and One Day International cricket umpire. Nicholls officiated in 17 Tests from 1997 to 2001 and 46 ODIs from 1995 to 2005. He was one of four West Indian umpires on the International Cricket Council's elite panel of international umpires. 

Eddie Nichols is a former police officer who worked in the Immigration Services of the Guyana Police Force. Nicholls played club cricket for the Guyanese police force cricket team. He is a widower and is the father of one son (deceased) and two daughters, Adelle Nicholls Telford born August 16, 1973 and one other.

See also
 List of Test cricket umpires
 List of One Day International cricket umpires

References

External links
Profile at ESPNcricinfo
Profile at CricketArchive

1947 births
Living people
Guyanese cricket umpires
West Indian Test cricket umpires
West Indian One Day International cricket umpires